was a Minister for Reconstruction and a Japanese politician serving in the House of Representatives in the Diet (national legislature) as a member of the Liberal Democratic Party. A native of Kakeya, Shimane and graduate of Keio University he was elected for the first time in 2000. His elder brother was former prime minister Noboru Takeshita. 

Before entering politics in 2000, Takeshita was a reporter with NHK, then began working for his brother as an aide in 1985.

He was the leader of the Heisei Kenkyukai faction from 2018 until his death 3 years later, which supported Yoshihide Suga in the 2020 Liberal Democratic Party of Japan leadership election.

Takeshita was affiliated to the openly revisionist organization Nippon Kaigi. He held an anti-homosexual stand.

In July 2021, Takeshita announced that he would be retiring from politics at the next general election for health reasons, having been diagnosed with esophageal cancer in 2019. He died in office on 17 September 2021.

References

External links
 Official website  in Japanese.
 http://www.takeshita-wataru.com/

1946 births
2021 deaths
People from Shimane Prefecture
Keio University alumni
Members of Nippon Kaigi
Members of the House of Representatives (Japan)
Liberal Democratic Party (Japan) politicians
21st-century Japanese politicians
Deaths from esophageal cancer
Deaths from cancer in Japan
Japanese reporters and correspondents